Shakhnazarov is a surname. Notable people with the surname include:

 Georgy Shakhnazarov (1924–2001), Soviet politician and political scientist
 Karen Shakhnazarov (born 1952), Soviet and Russian film director, producer, and screenwriter

Russian-language surnames